The 2014 Boels Rental Hills Classic is a one-day women's cycle race held in the Netherlands, from Sittard to Berg en Terblijt over 128.4 km on 30 May 2014. The race had a UCI rating of 1.1.

Results

Source

See also
 2014 in women's road cycling

References

Boels Rental Hills Classic
Holland Hills Classic
Boels Rental Hills Classic